An election to Belfast Corporation took place on Thursday 25 November 1897 as part of that year's local elections.

This was the first election for Belfast Corporation since 1887. Since that election the Belfast Corporation Act 1896 had increased the borough from 6,800 to 16,500 acres, and the electorate from 39,603 to 47,294. The need to delineate new ward boundaries meant that elections could not be completed in 1896, resulting in them being delayed until 1897.

Results by party

Ward Results

Court

Duncairn

Falls

Alderman

Councillors

Pottinger

Shankhill

Smithfield

St. George's & Dock

Victoria

References

1897 Irish local elections
1897
1897 elections in Ireland